The soundtrack to the 1993 film Frauds, featuring Guy Gross's score.

Frauds: Original Motion Picture Soundtrack
 "Roland's Suite" – 2:30
 "I've Got You Under My Skin" – 2:12
 "Waterfall" – 2:29
 "Beth" – 1:31
 "Jonathan" – 3:30
 "Burglary" – 2:51
 "Nightmare" – 2:34
 "Accusation" – 4:56
 "Confession" – 2:30
 "Christmas Vomit" – 3:28
 "House of Games" – 3:27
 "Roland's Bedroom" – 3:45
 "Toyland" – 3:44
 "The Game Begins" – 3:06
 "Roland Turns" – 4:15
 "Matthew" – 2:37
 "Finale" – 4:24
 "Roland's Toy Piano" – 2:16

 Tracks 1, 3-18 performed by the Victorian Philharmonic Orchestra
 Track 2 performed by Marcia Hines and Bob Coassin's Big Band
 All tracks orchestrated and conducted by Derek Williams

 | Composer       = Guy Gross
 | Conductor      = Derek Williams
 | Orchestrator   = Derek Williams
 | Format         = CD
 | EAN            = 9398601009920

References 

Comedy film soundtracks
1992 soundtrack albums